Sadalberga (or Salaberga) (c. 605 – c. 670) was the daughter of Gundoin, Duke of Alsace and his wife Saretrude. Sadalberga founded the Abbey of St John at Laon. She is the subject of a short hagiography, the Vita Sadalbergae.

Life
Gundoin of Alsace was on close terms with Waldebert, a Frankish nobleman who later became abbot of Luxeuil. Waldebert would come to guide Sadalberga in her monastic endeavors. According to her anonymous vita, Gundoin had extended hospitality to Waldebert's predecessor, Eustace of Luxeuil upon the Abbot's return from Bavaria, and Eustace had cured the child Sadalberga of blindness. Her brother Leudinus Bodo became Bishop of Toul.

Although she was drawn to religious life, her parents forced her to marry. Her first husband, Richramn, died after two months. Between 629 and 631, Gundoin removed the widowed Sadalberga from her convent of Remiremont and sought to marry her to a courtier of Dagobert I, at the king's insistence. Then she was wed to a nobleman, Blandinus, a close counselor of King Dagobert. She had five children, Saretrude, Ebana, Anstrudis, Eustasius (died in infancy), and Baldwin (Baudoin). Her husband Blandinus and two of her children, Baldwin (feast day October 16) and Anstrudis, became saints. Sadalberga's brother was Leudinus Bodo (d. 670). After some years, she and Blandinus agreed mutually to separate and assume contemplative lives. He became a hermit and she went into a nunnery at Poulangey, accompanied by Anstrudis.

Encouraged by Waldebert, Salaberga founded the abbey of St. John the Baptist at Laon. One of her kinsman had been bishop there, and his successor supported her efforts. She died there c. 670, and was succeeded as abbess by her daughter, Anstrudis.

See also
 Odile of Alsace

Notes

7th-century Frankish women
670 deaths
7th-century Frankish saints
Year of birth uncertain
Christian female saints of the Middle Ages
Colombanian saints